Serena Township is located in LaSalle County, Illinois. As of the 2010 census, its population was 1,138 and it contained 459 housing units. Serena Township changed its name from Warren Township in May, 1850.

Geography

Serena Township is governed from the Village of Serena.  The village has been incorporated since the early 1830s, and the Township Hall is located within town.  The township has the Serena Fire Protection District, which serves nearby Northville, Mission, Miller, and Freedom Townships.  Community Unit School District No. 2, which serves the area, is also headquartered in Serena, with the main High School for the district, as well as a Middle School and Elementary School located there as well.  The township has US Highway 52 running through it as well.

Demographics

References

External links
 US Census
 City-data.com
 Illinois State Archives

Townships in LaSalle County, Illinois
Populated places established in 1850
Townships in Illinois
1850 establishments in Illinois